Bassem Ben Nasser (born August 9, 1982 in Sousse) is a Tunisian footballer who plays as a midfielder. His clubs have included Étoile du Sahel, Club Athletique Bizertin, Jeunesse Sportive Kairouanaise and Avenir Sportif de La Marsa.

References

Footballers from Tunis
Tunisian footballers
Association football midfielders
1982 births
Living people
Étoile Sportive du Sahel players
JS Kairouan players
AS Marsa players